Vandiver is a census-designated place (CDP) and unincorporated community in Shelby County, Alabama, United States. Its population was 1168 as of the 2010 census. One structure in Vandiver, the Falkner School, is listed on the Alabama Register of Landmarks and Heritage.

Geography
The community is in the northeastern part of Shelby County. Alabama State Route 25 runs through the community, leading southeast 10 mi (16 km) to Vincent and north 10 mi (16 km) on an  winding and mountainous route to the city of Leeds.

Demographics

Notable people
Wes Helms, former Major League Baseball player

References

Census-designated places in Shelby County, Alabama
Census-designated places in Alabama
Unincorporated communities in Alabama
Unincorporated communities in Shelby County, Alabama